The Men's Marathon at the inaugural 1983 World Championships in Helsinki, Finland was held on August 14, 1983.

Medalists

Abbreviations
All times shown are in hours:minutes:seconds

Records

Intermediates

Final ranking

See also
 1983 Marathon Year Ranking
 Men's Olympic Marathon (1984)

References
 Results
 IAAF
 Leichatletik-Statistik-Seite

M
Marathons at the World Athletics Championships
1983 marathons
Men's marathons
Marathons in Finland